The First rout of the Jiangnan Battalion took place between 1853 and 1856 when the Qing government raised the Green Standard Army to fight against the Taiping Heavenly Kingdom. The action involved Qing forces surrounding the city of Nanking, the capital of the Taiping Heavenly Kingdom.

First rout of the Jiangnan Army Group

After the Taiping Heavenly Kingdom militia successfully occupied Nanking in the southern territory of Jiangnan, within ten days First Class Senior Gen. Xiang Rong, in command of 10,000 Green Standard Army troops, surrounded the walls of the city. The remnants of the former Qing garrison defending Nanjing were barricaded outside city walls inside the Ming Xiaoling Mausoleum.

Alongside Xiang Rong, the Green Standard Army was led by Second Class Senior Gen. Her Chyun and Lt. Gen. Zhang Guoliang. The leaders of the Taiping forces were Shi Dakai, Yang Xiuqing, Qin Rigang and Li Xiucheng.

The regular Army numbered 80,000 troops and the Taiping Rebellion militia force had 460,000 men.

Outcome
On June 1 the Nanjing army tried to stop Taiping forces but Governor of Jiangsu Jeer Hungar, the Mayor of Nanjing and their entire army of 7,800 were totally wiped out, with Jeer Hungar being killed by an artillery bomb.

The Qing army lost another battle later in the month and the remaining 36,000 troops retreated north. On August 9 Xiang Rong committed suicide by hanging himself, although others claimed he had a fatal overdose of opium due to the pain of his battle wounds in Danyang.

See also
Second Rout of the Jiangnan Battalion
Second Opium War

References

Draft History of Qing
1. Tucker, Spencer (2017). The Roots and Consequences of Civil Wars and Revolutions: Conflicts That Changed World History. Santa Barbara, California: ProQuest. pp. 225. .
2. Wacks, Gabriel (2018). "All Under Heaven: The Royal Court of the Taiping Heavenly Kingdom". pp. 31–32.
3. ^ Tucker, pp. 228.

Jiangnan
Foreign relations of the Qing dynasty
1856 in China
Jiangnan
History of Nanjing
Green Standard Army